Fred Schmertz (November 10, 1888 – March 25, 1976) was a founder member of the Millrose Athletic Association in 1908 and the Millrose Games in 1914. For the latter, he was meet director between 1934 and 1974.

Schmertz acted as assistant meet director for the Millrose Games from 1915 before acting as director. He was succeeded in the role of director by his son, Howard Schmertz. The Millrose Games has become one of the world's foremost international indoor track and field meets.

From 1928, Schmertz also acted in an official capacity for several United States Olympic teams.

Schmertz was inducted posthumously into the International Jewish Sports Hall of Fame in 1989, the Millrose Games Hall of Fame in 2003, and with his son Howard, the United States Track and Field Hall of Fame in 2012.

He is buried in Mount Hebron Cemetery, in Queens, New York.

References

External links
 
 

1888 births
1976 deaths
Burials at Mount Hebron Cemetery (New York City)